The 1964 United States presidential election in Connecticut took place on November 3, 1964, as part of the 1964 United States presidential election, which was held throughout all 50 states and D.C. Voters chose eight representatives, or electors to the Electoral College, who voted for president and vice president.

Connecticut voted overwhelmingly for the Democratic nominee, incumbent President Lyndon B. Johnson of Texas, over the Republican nominee, Senator Barry Goldwater of Arizona. Johnson ran with Senator Hubert H. Humphrey of Minnesota, while Goldwater's running mate was Congressman William E. Miller of New York.

Johnson carried Connecticut by a wide margin of 35.72%. His 67.81% vote share is the largest for a Democrat in Connecticut presidential election history, and the largest for any party since John Quincy Adams in 1828.

As of 2020, this is the only time in history that the towns of Harwinton and Middlebury voted Democratic as well as the most recent presidential election in which the Democratic nominee carried the towns of Bethlehem, Goshen, New Fairfield, Oxford, Shelton, and Somers. Johnson was the first Democrat ever to carry the towns of Bethel, Clinton, Scotland, Thomaston, West Hartford, Westbrook, and Wethersfield.

Results

By county

See also
 United States presidential elections in Connecticut

References

Connecticut
1964
1964 Connecticut elections